The Mid-Eastern Conference is an IHSAA-sanctioned conference in East Central Indiana. The conference formed in 1963 as schools from Delaware, Henry, and Randolph counties banded together with impending consolidations making their conference situations unstable. The conference has never been stable for long, varying between six and eight members between 1963 and 1977, and having as many as ten members since. While schools from Hancock, Madison and Wayne counties have participated, the conference has generally stayed within its original footprint. The league once again grew to ten members as Eastern Hancock and Shenandoah joined.

Current members

 Concurrent with HCC 1964-67.
 Concurrent with Randolph County Conference 1963-64.
 Wes-Del played from 1989 to 2008 in the second incarnation of the WRC.
 North Decatur joined the conference in Football only beginning with the 2021-22 school year.

Former members

 Concurrent with HCC 1963-67.
 Concurrent with HCC 1963-64.

Membership timeline

Sports
 Baseball
 Boys' Basketball
 Girls' Basketball
 Boys' Cross Country
 Girls' Cross Country
 Football (beginning in 2018-19)
 Boys' Golf
 Girls' Golf
 Softball
 Boys' Track and Field
 Girls' Track and Field
 Volleyball
 Wrestling
 Cheerleading

Conference Champions

Boys' Basketball 

 Titles for 1966-93 are unconfirmed.
 Muncie Burris & Randolph Southern tied in 1990 for the conference championship.

Girls' Basketball 

Titles for 1979-84 and 1986-2001 are unconfirmed.

Boys Cross Country 

Muncie Burris is no longer in the Mid-Eastern Conference.

Girls Cross Country 

Muncie Burris is no longer in the Mid-Eastern Conference.

Football

 North Decatur joining MEC for Football only in 2021-22.

Boys Golf 

Muncie Burris is no longer in the Mid-Eastern Conference.

Girls Golf

Softball

Boys Track & Field 

Frankton, Muncie Burris, and Northeastern are no longer in the Mid-Eastern Conference.
1994; Monroe Central and Muncie Burris were Co-Champions.

Girls Track & Field

Volleyball

Wrestling

State Champions
IHSAA State Champions

Cowan Blackhawks (2)
 2012 Volleyball (A)
 2019 Volleyball (A)

Burris Owls (23)
 1943 Boys' Track & Field
 1982 Volleyball
 1985 Volleyball
 1986 Volleyball
 1989 Volleyball
 1990 Volleyball
 1992 Volleyball
 1993 Volleyball
 1994 Volleyball
 1997 Volleyball (2A)
 1998 Volleyball (2A)
 1999 Volleyball (2A)
 2000 Volleyball (2A)
 2001 Volleyball (2A)
 2002 Volleyball (2A)
 2003 Volleyball (2A)
 2004 Volleyball (2A)
 2005 Volleyball (2A)
 2006 Volleyball (2A)
 2007 Volleyball (2A)
 2008 Volleyball (2A)
 2009 Volleyball (2A)
 2010 Volleyball (2A)

Daleville Broncos (2)
2016 Baseball (A)
2018 Baseball (A)

Wapahani Raiders (7)
 2002 Volleyball (A)
 2011 Volleyball (2A)
 2012 Volleyball (2A)
 2014 Baseball (2A)
 2015 Volleyball (2A)
 2016 Volleyball (2A)
 2022 Volleyball (2A)

Wes-Del Warriors (2)
 2011 Volleyball (A)
 2014 Volleyball (A)

References

Resources
 IHSAA Conferences
 IHSAA Directory

Indiana high school athletic conferences
High school sports conferences and leagues in the United States